Kasriel Broydo (1907–1945) was a songwriter, singer and coupletist. He was born in Vilnius and played in various troupes and marionette-theaters. His lyrics and songs, like  (The sun has spread around), were the folk songs of his place and time.

After the first World War Broydo moved to France and continued to work in theater. When Germany invaded Poland, he returned to Vilna. He was an integral and cherished participant, as writer, director and actor, to almost all the revi-theater programs in the Vilna ghetto theaters.

His last program in the Vilna ghetto, called  (Hold on, Moyshe!), was almost ready for performance when, during the liquidation of the ghetto in September 1943, Broydo was seized by the Gestapo. He was taken to Estonia, where he and his friends, Sime and Marek Shapiro, although interred, created performances for their fellow inmates in the labor camp. It was at this time that Broydo became religious.

Broydo's song  (It's always dark for us), music by Henech Kon, written on a motif by Moshe Broderzon, was taken into Sh. Katsherginski's ; the Vilna Ghetto Ensemble performed it in the revue .

Broydo's most famous song may be  (Must it always be this way?) sung in revi-theaters in Poland before the Second World War. In 1945 he was sent to Königsberg (Kaliningrad), Germany, where he and hundreds of other Jews were thrown in the Baltic sea and drowned.

More Broydo songs
  (Ghetto, I'll never forget you)
  (The hour has come)
  (Moyshe, hold on)
  sung by the orphans of the Vilna ghetto
  (We, too, are flesh and blood)
  (From a twig a tree will bloom) - also called  - music by Yankl Trupianski
  (women) sung in the ghetto by Dora Rubina
  to music by Fanny Gordon, sung by Mina Bern and Joseph Widetzky before World War II

See also
 Chana Mlotek,  "Kasriel Broydo - ." Publisher: Yiddish Forward, June 27, 2005

References

1907 births
1945 deaths
Musicians from Vilnius
People from Vilna Governorate
Polish cabaret performers
Jewish cabaret performers
Jewish songwriters
People killed by Nazi Germany
20th-century poets
Lithuanian Jews who died in the Holocaust
20th-century comedians
Polish civilians killed in World War II
Polish expatriates in France